Elizabeth Devine may refer to:

Elizabeth Devine (writer) (born 1961), scriptwriter
Lizzie Devine, a character from Codename: Kids Next Door
Lizzy DeVine, musician
Betsy Devine (born 1946), writer